Robyn Slovo  is a South African film producer, based in the UK. Her work includes the 2000 film Morvern Callar, the 2006 film Catch a Fire, and the 2011 film Tinker, Tailor, Soldier, Spy.

Biography
Slovo started her career in theatre, before moving into the television and film industry, working first as a script editor and development executive for the BBC, and then as a film producer for Company Pictures and Working Title Films.

Slovo's family is Jewish. She is the daughter of Joe Slovo and Ruth First — both major figures in the anti-apartheid struggle who lived perilous lives of exile, armed resistance, and occasional imprisonment, culminating in her mother's assassination in 1982. A family memoir in the form of a feature film, A World Apart, was written by her sister Shawn Slovo and starred Barbara Hershey. She played her mother in the film Catch a Fire, also written by her sister Shawn Slovo. She is the youngest sister of novelist Gillian Slovo and screenwriter Shawn Slovo.

References

External links

Biography at Working Title Films
Biography at Company Pictures

Living people
Robyn Slovo
South African producers
British film producers
South African Jews
White South African people
Year of birth missing (living people)